Drlupa may refer to:

Drlupa (Kraljevo), a village in Kraljevo, Serbia
Drlupa (Sopot), a village in Sopot, Serbia